Sanda Dewi Mwei Zeik was a principal queen consort of King Binnya U of Martaban–Hanthawaddy.

Born Mwei Zeik, she was the third daughter of Minister Than-Bon of the Martaban court. She and her elder two sisters Mwei It and Mwei Kaw became queens of Binnya U soon after his accession. Their youngest sister Mwei Daw later became a wife of Binnya U about five years later.

Her royal title was Sanda Dewi. She had a daughter named Tala Mi Daw (also spelled Tala May Daw), the first wife of King Razadarit.

References

Bibliography
 

Queens consort of Hanthawaddy